Alexandre Chabot (born December 27, 1981) is a French professional rock climber, specialising in lead climbing. He won three consecutive Lead Climbing World Cups and three consecutive Rock Masters. In France, he was awarded seven times the national Lead Climbing Champion title.

Biographic notes 
He discovered climbing when he was six years old, during a vacation with his parents at Col des Grand Montets, near Chamonix. When he was 13 he joined a local climbing club. 

In 1997 (age 16) he redpointed his first 8a route, Rêve de Papillon (Buoux, France). 

In 2000 (age 18) he won his first World Cup medal.

Rankings

Climbing World Cup

Climbing World Championships

Number of medals in the Climbing World Cup

Lead

Notable ascents

Redpointed routes 
:
 PuntX - Gorges du Loup (FRA) - August 12, 2007 - First ascent
 Abysse - Gorges du Loup (FRA) - July 28, 2006 - First ascent
 Kinematix - Gorges du Loup (FRA) - September 5, 2003

:
 Trip-Tik To-Nik - Gorges du Loup (FRA)
 Reaccion indirecta - Argentina
 Ultimate Sacrifice - Gorges du Loup (FRA) - August 25, 2003

See also
List of grade milestones in rock climbing
History of rock climbing
Rankings of most career IFSC gold medals

References

External links 

 

French rock climbers
1981 births
Living people
Competitors at the 2005 World Games
World Games silver medalists
Sportspeople from Reims
IFSC Climbing World Championships medalists
IFSC Climbing World Cup overall medalists